Herk-de-Stad is a city and municipality located in the Belgian province of Limburg. On 1 January 2018, Herk-de-Stad had a total population of 12,661. The total area is 42.83 km² which gives a population density of 296 inhabitants per km².

Besides the village of Herk-de-Stad itself, the municipality contains the communities of Berbroek, Schulen and Donk. Donk contains two country houses, both of the eighteenth-century, Kasteel Hamont and Kasteel Landwijk, which stands on the site of a castle established in the 12th century.

Rock Herk
There is an annual rock festival in the village, Rock Herk. There is a balanced mix of techno, drum 'n bass, electronica, alternative rock, post-rock, punk-rock, hardcore punk, metal, stoner, rock 'n roll, and related genres. Bands that played in the past include Stretch Arm Strong, Isis, Explosions in the Sky, New Wet Kojak, Karate, Add N to (X), Thin White Rope, Swervedriver, Spiritualized, Cosmic Psychos, Slapshot, Southern Culture on the Skids, Barkmarket, and Godflesh.

Notable people
 Virginie Claes, Miss Belgium 2006
 Annemie Coenen, the singer of former Ian Van Dahl now known as AnnaGrace
 Godefroy Wendelin, astronomer

References

External links
 
Official website - only available in Dutch
Rock Herk official site
Herk-de-Stad.info Independent informal website - only available in Dutch

 
Municipalities of Limburg (Belgium)